WLW is a radio station (700 AM) licensed to Cincinnati, Ohio, United States.

WLW may also refer to:

Media 

 The following radio station founded or previously owned by the Crosley Broadcasting Corporation:
 WLVQ, a radio station (96.3 FM) licensed to Columbus, Ohio, United States, which formerly held the WLWF ("WLW-F") call sign
 The following television stations founded or previously owned by the Crosley Broadcasting Corporation:
 WLWT (channel 5 analog/35 digital) licensed to Cincinnati, Ohio, originally rendered as "WLW-T"
 WTHR (channel 13 analog/13 digital) licensed to Indianapolis, Indiana, which held the WLWI ("WLW-I") call sign from 1957 until 1976
 WCMH (channel 4 analog/14 digital) licensed to Columbus, Ohio, which held the WLWC ("WLW-C") call sign from 1949 until 1976
 WDTN (channel 2 analog/50 digital) licensed to Dayton, Ohio, which held the WLWD ("WLW-D") call sign from 1949 until 1976
 WXIA (channel 11 analog/10 digital) licensed to Atlanta, Georgia, which held the WLWA ("WLW-A") call sign from 1953 until 1962
 KALL, a radio station (700 AM) licensed to Salt Lake City, Utah, which held the KWLW call sign (a reflection of being on the same frequency as WLW) from 1997 until 1999
 DWLW, a radio station owned by the Manila Broadcasting Company licensed to Lucena City in the Philippines.

Transport
 Welwyn North railway station (National Rail station code: WLW), Hertfordshire, England
 Willows-Glenn County Airport (IATA: WLW), Glenn County, California

Other uses 
 Woolworths Group (United Kingdom) (LSE and NYSE: WLW)
 World League Wrestling, an independent professional wrestling promotion based in Eldon, Missouri
 Windows Live Writer, a desktop blog-publishing application
 Woman Loving Woman, see Gay, Lesbian, Bisexual, Transgender and Straight Alliance